The British Virgin Islands competed at the 2018 Commonwealth Games in the Gold Coast, Australia from April 4 to April 15, 2018. The British Virgin Islands announced it will send a squad of 10 athletes. It was the British Virgin Islands's 8th appearance at the Commonwealth Games.

Track and field athlete Kyron McMaster was the country's flag bearer during the opening ceremony. The islands also won its first ever Commonwealth Games medal, through McMaster winning the gold in the men's 400 m hurdles event.

Competitors
The following is the list of number of competitors participating at the Games per sport/discipline.

Medalists

Athletics

The British Virgin Islands announced a team of 8 athletes (3 men, 5 women) will compete at the 2018 Commonwealth Games.

Men
Track & road events

Field events

Women
Track & road events

Field events

Squash

The British Virgin Islands announced a team of 2 athletes (2 men) will compete at the 2018 Commonwealth Games.

Individual

Doubles

See also
British Virgin Islands at the 2018 Summer Youth Olympics

References

Nations at the 2018 Commonwealth Games
British Virgin Islands at the Commonwealth Games
2018 in British Virgin Islands sport